Pitkämäki is a Finnish surname. Notable people with the surname include:

 Juha Pitkämäki (born 1979), Finnish ice hockey player
 Tero Pitkämäki (born 1982), Finnish javelin thrower

Finnish-language surnames